Rinconsauria is an extinct clade of giant titanosaurian sauropods known from the late Cretaceous period of Argentina.

Systematics
Rinconsauria was coined by Calvo et al. (2007) to include their new titanosaur Muyelensaurus and the previously described Rinconsaurus. Santucci and Arruda-Campos (2011) recovered Rinconsauria as part of Aeolosaurini, as did Franca et al. (2016) and Silva et al. (2019). However, cladistic analyses by Gonzalez-Riga et al. (2019) and Mannion et al. (2019) found Aeolosaurus to be in a phylogenetically disparate position than Rinconsauria, with Rinconsauria as sister to Lognkosauria in the clade Colossosauria.

References

Lithostrotians